Moroney is a surname. Notable people with the surname include:

Davitt Moroney (born 1950), British musicologist and keyboardist
Des Moroney (1935–2018), Canadian ice hockey player
Jack Moroney (1917–1999), Australian cricketer
James Moroney (born 1953), American rower
Jim Moroney (baseball) (1883–1929), American baseball player
Jim Moroney (public servant) (1898–1965), Australian public servant
Joe Moroney (1890–1956), Australian rules footballer
Ken Moroney (born 1945), Australian police commissioner
Mary Agnes Moroney (born 1928), American child who went missing in 1930
Megan Moroney (born 1997), American singer
Mick Moroney (born 1950), Irish hurler
Michael Moroney (horseman) New Zealand thoroughbred racehorse trainer
Mike Moroney (1933–2015), Australian long jumper
Nick Moroney (born 1972), Australian high jumper
Robert Moroney (1885–1958), Australian cricketer
Shane Moroney (born 1989), American soccer player
Sue Moroney (born 1964), New Zealand politician
Thomas Maroney (1895–1971), American racewalker
Tommy Moroney (1923–1981), Irish soccer and rugby player

See also
 
 Morony (disambiguation)
 Maroney (disambiguation)
 Moroni (disambiguation)